The Most Rev Charles Allen Seager  (1872–1948) was Anglican Bishop of Ontario, then Huron and finally  Metropolitan of Ontario in the 20th century.

Born in 1872, he was educated at Trinity College, Toronto. He was in turn rector of St Cyprian's, Toronto, principal of St Mark's Divinity Hall, Vancouver, British Columbia, provost (1921–1926) and vice-chancellor of his old college and finally, before his elevation to the episcopate, prebendary and chancellor of Toronto Cathedral.

He died in 1948.

References

 

 

1872 births
Trinity College (Canada) alumni
University of Toronto alumni
Anglican bishops of Ontario
Anglican bishops of Huron
20th-century Anglican Church of Canada bishops
Metropolitans of Ontario
20th-century Anglican archbishops
1948 deaths